Art Murmur is a collection of visual arts experiences designed to expose and promote Oakland's art scene. Primarily known for the First Friday Art Walk each month mostly held in the Uptown, Koreatown/Northgate, and downtown neighborhoods of Oakland, California, Oakland Art Murmur, a non-profit organization, draws thousands of people to visual art venues across all of Oakland. The event began in 2006 at the intersection of 23rd Street and Telegraph Avenue. In 2012, the street festival component was taken over by KONO, a neighborhood community group, becoming the "Oakland First Fridays Festival″ along Telegraph Avenue. One organization became two, though they remain closely aligned as cultural partners. Oakland Art Murmur is focused on connecting the public to Oakland's visual art, through programming such as the weekly Saturday Stroll art walk, different walking tours to inspire and educate participants about art, and the First Friday Art Walk.

See also
Ghost Ship warehouse fire
25th Street Collective

References

External links

Official website, Oakland Art Murmur

Art festivals in the United States
Culture of Oakland, California
Art in the San Francisco Bay Area
Arts organizations based in the San Francisco Bay Area
Tourist attractions in Oakland, California
Tourist attractions in Alameda County, California